George King, 3rd Earl of Kingston (9 April 1771 – 18 October 1839), styled Viscount Kingsborough from 1797 to 1799, was an Irish nobleman.

He was the son of Robert King, 2nd Earl of Kingston of Mitchelstown Castle, who he succeeded in 1799.

He was returned as a Member of the Irish House of Commons for County Roscommon in 1798, vacating the seat in the following year when he succeeded his father to the peerage and briefly taking his seat in the Irish House of Lords before it was abolished in 1800 after the union with Great Britain. He was created Baron Kingston in the Peerage of the United Kingdom in 1821, thus giving him and his descendants an automatic seat in the UK House of Lords. 

In 1823, he demolished the existing Palladian house on the Mitchelstown estate and replaced it with a new castle designed by James and George Richard Pain. It had 60 principal and 20 minor bedrooms, a 100-foot-long (30 m) gallery, three libraries, morning room, dining room (which could seat 100 guests at one sitting) and various other facilities.

On 5 May 1794, he married Lady Helena, the daughter of Stephen Moore, 1st Earl Mount Cashell. They had six children:
Lady Helena King (11 August 1793 – 20 November 1853), married Philip Davies-Cooke on 8 December 1829
Edward King, Viscount Kingsborough (1795–1837), antiquarian who predeceased his father
Robert King, 4th Earl of Kingston (1796–1867); his heir
Hon. George King (20 August 1798 – 2 May 1801)
James King, 5th Earl of Kingston (1800–1869)
Lady Adelaide Charlotte King (died August 1854), married Charles Tankerville Webber (died March 1854), son of Daniel Webb Webber, on 2 August 1834

George King's sister Margaret King married his wife's brother Stephen Moore, 2nd Earl Mount Cashell.

References

1771 births
1839 deaths
Kingsborough, George King, Viscount
George
Members of the Irish House of Lords
Members of the Parliament of Ireland (pre-1801) for County Roscommon constituencies
Earls of Kingston
Peers of the United Kingdom created by George IV